A leadership election was held by the Malaysian Chinese Association (MCA) on 28 March 2010. It was won by then Deputy President of MCA, Chua Soi Lek.

Central Committee election results
Source

President

Deputy President

Vice Presidents

Central Working Committee Members

References

2010 elections in Malaysia
Malaysian Chinese Association leadership election
Malaysian Chinese Association leadership elections